Araeodontia is a genus of checkered beetles in the family Cleridae. There are about five described species in Araeodontia.

Species
These five species belong to the genus Araeodontia:
 Araeodontia isabellae (Wolcott, 1910)
 Araeodontia marginalis Barr, 1952
 Araeodontia peninsularis (Schaeffer, 1904)
 Araeodontia picipennis (Barr, 1950)
 Araeodontia picta Barr, 1952

References

Further reading

 
 
 
 

Tillinae
Articles created by Qbugbot